Restless Nights is the second album by singer/songwriter Karla Bonoff. The album peaked at No. 31 on the Billboard albums chart and number 66 on the Australian Kent Music Report.

Track listing
All songs written by Karla Bonoff, except where noted.

Reception
AllMusic's William Ruhlmann retrospectively called the first track, "Trouble Again", "a gem (as Linda Ronstadt proved when she recorded it)" but concluded that the album "did not represent the leap that would have been required to vault Bonoff into the ranks of her star friends."

Rolling Stone's Don Shewey dismissed Bonoff's work as "sappy, MOR schlock." Though "Trouble Again" and "Baby Don't Go" are "fast, fun and disposable — i.e., everything a pop single should be. The remainder of Restless Nights is insufferable sludge."

Personnel
 Karla Bonoff – lead vocals, acoustic guitar (1, 2, 4, 5, 6, 7, 9), piano (4, 8), backing vocals (1, 4, 7, 8)
 Ed Black - electric guitar (8)
 Jackie DeShannon – backing vocals (4)
 Dan Dugmore – electric guitar (1, 4)
 Kenny Edwards – bass guitar (1, 2, 4, 5, 6, 7, 8, 9), backing vocals (1, 6, 8)
 Steve Forman – percussion (1, 7)
 Andrew Gold – electric guitar (6, 7),  electric piano (2), percussion (6), backing vocals (6)
 Don Grolnick – piano (1, 4) electric piano (3, 5)
 Don Henley – backing vocals (2)
 Garth Hudson – accordion (9)
 Danny Kortchmar - electric guitar (2, 8)
 Russ Kunkel – drums (1, 4, 5)
 David Lindley – acoustic guitar (5)
 Rick Marotta – drums (2, 6, 7, 8)
 J. D. Souther – backing vocals (2, 9)
 James Taylor – acoustic guitar and backing vocals (9)
 Waddy Wachtel – electric guitar (1, 4, 6, 7)
 Wendy Waldman – backing vocals (7)

References

1979 albums
Karla Bonoff albums
Columbia Records albums